Sammy Youssouf (born 7 September 1976) was a Danish professional football player, who ended his professional career representing Vejle Boldklub in the Danish Superliga.

Youssouf signed for St Johnstone in January 2002, and scored on his debut in a 4-1 loss to Dundee United.

Youssouf signed for Queens Park Rangers in January 2006.

Youssouf made his debut for Vejle Boldklub on 5 August 2007 scoring one goal in the 2-1 win against Skive IK. In the summer of 2009 he had to retire from professional football due to injuries.

References

1976 births
Living people
Danish men's footballers
Hvidovre IF players
St Johnstone F.C. players
Akademisk Boldklub players
RBC Roosendaal players
C.S. Marítimo players
Queens Park Rangers F.C. players
Viborg FF players
Vejle Boldklub players
Danish expatriate men's footballers
Expatriate footballers in Scotland
Expatriate footballers in the Netherlands
Expatriate footballers in Portugal
Expatriate footballers in England
Danish expatriate sportspeople in Portugal
Association football forwards
Fremad Amager players
Fremad Valby players
Footballers from Copenhagen